Monfils is a surname of French origin, meaning "my son." Notable people with the surname include:

Daryl Monfils (born 1993), French tennis player
Elina Svitolina Monfils (born 1994), Ukrainian tennis player
Gaël Monfils (born 1986), French tennis player
Michael Monfils (born 1938), American mayor
Nadine Monfils (born 1953), Belgian writer, film director and producer
Philippe Monfils (born 1939), Belgian politician

See also
Bonfils

References